Love in a Taxi is a 1980 American film starring Diane Sommerfield and Jim Jacobs.

Plot
The story of a romance between a Jewish New York cab driver, Sam, and Corinne, an African-American mother and bank clerk with a young son, Davey.  After Davey rides in Sam's cab one day, Davey brings Sam and Corinne together. Corinne and Sam are accidentally involved in a drug scam that could land them both in serious trouble.

Background
Star Jim Jacobs had previously worked under director Robert Sickinger at the Hull House Association in Chicago during the late 1960s. Both were better known for their stage work; Jacobs' only other major contribution to film was an indirect one (writing much of the original material that was incorporated into the major hit film Grease).

References

External links

1980 films
American romantic drama films
1980 romantic drama films
Films set in New York City
1980s English-language films
1980s American films